Sungai Gadut Komuter station is a train station in Sungai Gadut, Senawang, Negeri Sembilan, Malaysia. The station is served by the KTM Komuter's Seremban Line, part of the larger Klang Valley Integrated Transit System.

History
Sungai Gadut station was built as a result of the double track electrification to Gemas. Initially, the Seremban line was only extended to here in 2011. Rembau was brought to the line in 2012 even though most trains terminated here. The KTM line extended to Tampin and Gemas in 2015 but as part of a shuttle service from Seremban. As the service to Gemas was cut back to Tampin in 2016, the shuttle service was dissolved and now trains from Kuala Lumpur will go to Sungai Gadut and Tampin. Many trains still terminate here (mostly in the off-peak).

Layout
Contrary to most KTM Komuter stations where the tracks and platforms are at ground level, Sungai Gadut station is elevated. Future elevated stations along the West Coast Line are currently being constructed in the Johorean section, particularly in Segamat, Kluang and Renggam as part of the Gemas-Johor Bahru Electrification and Double Tracking Project (EDTP).

Location
The station is located in Sungai Gadut, an offshoot suburb of the Seremban metropolitan area. The station also serves Taman Seremban Jaya, Bandar Seremban Selatan, and the southern parts of Senawang.

References

See also
 Rail transport in Malaysia

Railway stations in Negeri Sembilan
Railway stations opened in 2011
Seremban Line